USS Kilauea may refer to the following ships of the United States Navy:

 , was acquired by the US Navy 14 November 1940 and renamed Mount Baker on 17 March 1943
 , was launched in 1967 and removed from service in 2008

United States Navy ship names